The Pinka is a river in Central Europe with a length of approximately . Its source is located in Styria, eastern Austria, next to the provincial border of Burgenland. Further, it flows into the Rába river near Körmend.

Important towns on its course are Pinkafeld (Hungarian: Pinkafő) and Oberwart (Hungarian: Felsőőr).

References

Rivers of Burgenland
Rivers of Styria
Rivers of Hungary
Oberwart District
Geography of Vas County
Rivers of Austria
International rivers of Europe